Sutton Place may refer to:

Canada
 Sutton Place Hotel, a former hotel in Toronto, Ontario
 The Sutton Place, a hotel in Vancouver, British Columbia

England
 Sutton Place, Hackney, a Georgian terrace in London
 Sutton Place, Surrey, a country house

United States
 Sutton Place, Manhattan, a neighborhood in New York City
 York Avenue and Sutton Place, the street for which the neighborhood is named